Mount Liberty is a  mountain in the White Mountains of New Hampshire. Overlooking Franconia Notch, it is part of Franconia Ridge, the second highest mountain group in the Whites after the Presidential Range. It lies south of Mount Lafayette, the highest summit along the ridge, and is listed among the Appalachian Mountain Club's "four-thousand footers".

Gallery

See also

 Flume Gorge

References

Mountains of New Hampshire
White Mountains (New Hampshire)
Mountains of Grafton County, New Hampshire
New England Four-thousand footers
Mountains on the Appalachian Trail